Tetsuo Takashima (高嶋 哲夫 Takashima Tetsuo, born July 7, 1949) is a contemporary Japanese author active in a number of genres that include science fiction, mystery fiction, historical fiction, social commentary, and juvenile fiction.

Biography

 1949 Okayama Birth
 1973 Keio University Faculty-of-Technology Graduation
 1975 Keio University Graduate School Engineering Graduate Course Master Course End
 1975 Japan Atomic Energy Research Institute Research Worker
 1978 University of California Studying Abroad
 1995 Mystery Writers of Japan Member
 2000 Japan Writer's Association Member
 2001 National Coaching School Cooperative Society Director
 2007 Filmize Midnight Eagle (Shochiku-Universal Pictures) reviewed by Matt Zoller Seitz in The New York Times (23 November 2007)).

Works in English translation
 Fallout (original title: Merutodaun [Meltdown]), Vertical, 2013
 Megaquake: How Japan and the World Should Respond (original title: Kyodai Jishin No Hi [A day of Huge Earthquake]), Potomac Books, 2015
 TSUNAMI, Shueisha, 2016
 THE WALL: The Refugees' Path to a New Republic, Museyon, 2020
 THE GENE OF LIFE, Museyon, 2021

Awards
 1979 - Atomic Energy Society of Japan Technical Prize
 1990 - North Japan Literary Prize: 
 1994 - Shosetsu Gendai Mystery Newcomer Award: Fallout
 1999 - Suntory Mystery Award, Grand-prix and Reader Prize: Intruder
 2006 - Iue Cultural Prize
 2017 - Energy Forum Award Prize: Fukushima Dai-2 No Kiseki (福島第二の奇跡,Miracle of Fukushima II Nuclear Power Plant)

Works

Novels
 1999 
 1999 
 2000 
 2000 
 2000 
 2000 
 2001 
 2001 
 2001 
 2002 
 2002 
 2003  (Fallout, Vertical, 2013)
 2003 
 2004 
Manga adaptation: Illustrated by Shinji Hiramatsu (2005)
 2005 
 2008 
 2008 
 2009 
 2009 
 2009 
 2010 
 2010 
 2011 
 2011 
 2013 
 2013 
 2014 
 2015 
 2016 
 2016 
 2017 Okinawa Confidential 2 "Blue Dragon" (沖縄コンフィデンシャル ブルードラゴン)
 2018 Terrorism In The Official Residence (官邸襲撃)
 2018 Hurricane (ハリケーン)
 2019 Okinawa Confidential 3 "The Way of Life of Lekios" (沖縄コンフィデンシャル レキオスの生きる道)
 2020 
 2021

Manga series
 2006  (Illustrated by Takanori Yasaka)

Essays
 1982 " America No Gakko Seikatsu (アメリカの学校生活, U.S. School Life) "
 1984 " California No Akane-chan (カリフォルニアのあかねちゃん, My Akane of California) "
 2000 " Juku Wo Gakko Ni (塾を学校に, It is to a school about a private school) "(Collaboration)
 2001 " Kouritsu Gakko Ga Nakunaru (公立学校がなくなる, A public school dies) "(Collaboration)
 2005 " Kyodai Jishin No Ato Ni Osottekita Koto (巨大地震の後に襲ってきたこと, Be attacked by Huge Earthquake) "
 2006 " Kyodai Jishin No Hi (巨大地震の日, A day of Huge Earthquake)  (Megaquake: How Japan and the World Should Respond translate by Robert D. Eldridge, Potomac Books, 2015)"
 2013 " Tokai Tonankai Nankai Kyodai Rendo Jisjin (東海・東南海・南海　巨大連動地震, Nankai Trough massive earthquake) "
 2015 " Sekai Ni Warawareru Nihon No Genpatsu Senryaku (世界に嗤われる日本の原発戦略, World laugh nuclear power strategy of Japan) "
 2016 " Fukushima Dai-2 No Kiseki (福島第二の奇跡, Miracle of Fukushima II Nuclear Power Plant) "
 2020 " Shutokansengo no Nihon (「首都感染」後の日本, Japan after the "Capital Infection") "
 2021 " Shuto Okayama (首都岡山, Capital City Okayama) "

References

External links
 Profile at Vertical, Inc.

1949 births
Living people
20th-century Japanese novelists
21st-century Japanese novelists
Japanese crime fiction writers
Japanese children's writers